In shogi, the Yamada joseki is a joseki for a Rapid Attack Static Rook vs Fourth File Rook opening.

It is named after Michiyoshi Yamada.

The Yamada joseki starts after the Static Rook player has developed a Left Silver-57 Rapid Attack formation with a Boat castle and the Ranging Rook player has constructed a Mino castle and kept their bishop diagonal closed.

After this position, the joseki details balanced play for four different responses to the Static Rook formation initiated by the Fourth File Rook opponent.

See also

 Left Silver-57 Rapid Attack
 Saginomiya Joseki
 Fourth File Rook

Bibliography

External links

 YouTube: HIDETCHI's Shogi Openings:
 Yamada's Jouseki: Oblique Climbing Silver #1
 Yamada's Jouseki: Oblique Climbing Silver #2 (B*5d variation)
 Yamada's Jouseki: Oblique Climbing Silver #3 (P-6e variation)
 Yamada's Jouseki: Edge Bishop Strategy #1
 Yamada's Jouseki: Edge Bishop Strategy #2
 Shogi in English: Static Rook vs 4th-file Rook: Yamada Opening Theory

Shogi openings
Static Rook vs Ranging Rook openings
Static Rook openings
Fourth File Rook openings